The Zotye T700 is a mid-size CUV by Zotye.

Overview

Revealed in 2016, the Zotye T700 is the production version of the Zotye T600 S concept from the 2015 Shanghai Auto Show. Slightly larger and positioned above the Zotye T600, the Zotye T700 is still a mid-size CUV. Pricing of the Zotye T700 ranges from 106,800 to 155,800 yuan. Not only powered by 4G18 turbo engine and 4G63 turbo engine from Mitsubishi, it was told to have 6-speed dual-clutch transmission from German gearbox manufacturer ZF Friedrichshafen.

The Zotye T700 name was actually used during the development phase of the Zotye SR9. However, the name was dropped soon after and switched to Zotye SR8 before immediately changing to Zotye SR9.
In Vietnam, it is on sale as the Zotye Z8, with the same engine and gearbox options.

Safety functions
In China, the T700 passed the C-NCAP crash test with rating of five stars. Moreover, this car also equipped with other safety functions such as anti-lock braking system (ABS) and electronic brakeforce distribution (EBD). The electronic stability control (ESC) is also a standard safety feature of this affordable-luxury SUV.

Controversies
During development, the T700 was criticized to have an exterior design imitating Range Rover Evoque and Maserati Levante. The interior of T700 is also have rising debates for copying both Land Rover and Porsche' s interior design. Moreover, the GPS system of the T700 is also a controversy for showing the illegal nine-dash line of China on the East Sea.

References

External links

 Zotye International | Cars, SUVs, Vans and many more: T700
 Chi tiết Zotye Z8 (T700 và T800) kèm giá bán (12/2019)
 c-ncap.org

Cars of China
T700
Crossover sport utility vehicles
Mid-size sport utility vehicles
Front-wheel-drive vehicles
All-wheel-drive vehicles
C-NCAP large off-road
Cars introduced in 2016